Zamazaan (1965 – 8 April 1990) was a French Thoroughbred racehorse and Champion sire in New Zealand and Australia. 

Zamazaan was bred by the HH Aga Khan IV.

Racing career

Zamazaan was a winner of 5 stakes races from 2,400 metres to 3,100 metres.

He retired from the track in 1969.

Stud career

He was syndicated for a then record NZ$200,000 and sent to stand at stud beginning in the 1970 season at Keith Burley's Carlyle Stud in East Tāmaki near Auckland, New Zealand.

He won the:
 Dewar Stallion Trophy award in 1977–8 with progeny earnings of $490,595 (excluding trophies).
 Champion New Zealand Sire in 1985-86  

Zamazaan sired 58 stakes winners for 123 stakes wins including:
 Beau Zam (Belle Cherie by Sovereign Edition) 
 Gelsomino (Salima by Copenhagen II) 
 Good Lord (Love In Bloom by Todman), winner of the 1977 and 1978 Wellington Cup and 1978 Sydney Cup
 Lord Reims (Right On by Ward Drill) 
 Phizam (Phius by Oncidium) 
 Veloso (Top of The Pops by Bismark II), winner of the 1983 Sydney Cup and Mackinnon Stakes and placed in multiple Group 1 races.

Zamazaan was dam-sire of:
 Doriemus (Golden Woods by Norman Pentaquad), winner of the 1995 Caulfield Cup and Melbourne Cup. 
 The Filbert (Fauxzann by Souvran), winner of the 1985 New Zealand Stakes.

Zamazaan's legacy has continued with the following:
 Elvstroem
 Nature Strip

See also

 Thoroughbred racing in New Zealand

References 
 
 Leading Sires of Australia

External links
 Zamazaan's pedigree and partial racing stats

1965 racehorse births
1990 racehorse deaths
Champion Thoroughbred Sires of Australia
Champion Thoroughbred Sires of New Zealand
New Zealand Thoroughbred sires
Racehorses bred in France
Racehorses trained in France
Thoroughbred family 7